Power Plant Live! is a collection of bars, restaurants and other businesses in the Inner Harbor section of downtown Baltimore, Maryland. It was developed by The Cordish Companies and opened in phases during 2001, 2002, and 2003. The entertainment complex gets its name from the nearby "Power Plant" (Pratt Street Power Plant) building, three blocks south on municipal Pier 4 on East Pratt Street facing the Inner Harbor, which was also later re-developed by Cordish. 

The complex is located along Market Place and is served by the Baltimore Metro Subway's Shot Tower/Market Place station.

History
The "Power Plant" is a mixed-use project re-developed in the late 1990s in a former coal-burning power generating station, originally built in 1900-05 for the old United Railways and Electric Company which operated the recently unified public transportation system of streetcars, trolleys, and some cable cars (in the early years), at the beginning of the 20th century up to its re-organization in 1935 as the Baltimore Transit Company (taken over by the state Mass Transit Administration of the Maryland Department of Transportation in 1968). The President of the U. R. & E. Company at the time was John Mifflin Hood, (1843-1906),  who was also recently longtime president of the Western Maryland Railway, 1874 to 1901 and developed its large Port Covington railroad/port terminal on the south side of the city, along the Middle Branch (formerly Ferry Branch) of the Patapsco River in Baltimore Harbor on the South Baltimore peninsula to Whetstone Point. The industrial / transport facilities were recently razed in the 1990s and replaced by a commercial re-development of "big box" stores and the printing plant of the major local daily newspaper, the "Baltimore Sun"

Port Covington is east of South Hanover Street (Maryland Route 2) and the old 1917 Hanover Street Bridge and faces onto Winan's Cove. Earlier it was the site of Fort Covington, an artillery redoubt of brick and earthen berms built in 1813 during the War of 1812 and came under bombardment attack along with neighboring Camp Look-Out (modern Leone-Riverside Park), Battery Babcock along the shoreline and famous Fort McHenry on Whetstone Point by the British Royal Navy in the Battle of Baltimore, September 12-13-14, 1814.

Competition for tourism dollars was fierce in the mid-1980s after the opening of "Harborplace", which opened in 1980. These new attractions, joined with the recently constructed (1971) of a new exhibition structure for the ancient cultural institution Maryland Academy of Sciences (from 1797) in its  Maryland Science Center  and the historic ship USS Constellation (1854 Sloop of War)

This was also the historic site of the original Centre Market at East Baltimore Street (formerly "Long Street" when the town was laid out in 1730, and later known as "Market Street", recognizing the important place that it led to in the east), south to Water Street (former original shoreline of the harbor "Basin" in colonial times)  and east of South Frederick Street (alley) to the adjacent Jones Falls stream. It was also traditionally known as the "Marsh Market" because of being on the site of the old Thomas "Harrison's Marsh" on the western banks of the Jones Falls during the colonial era 18th and early 19th centuries which separated old Baltimore Town from the neighboring village of Jones' Town to the northeast across the Falls - spanned by a vital link in early 18th century local commerce and growth, a wooden bridge which was built which resulted in the naming of "Bridge Street" (later to be renamed North Gay Street, after a local family) and led to the merger of the two villages by 1745.  Here in 1763,  the first public market house for both merged towns was constructed and became the most important center for commerce resulting in its original name of "Centre Market".

It wasn't until two decades later, after the American Revolution ended, that additional market houses throughout the expanding city were constructed including today's world-famous "Lexington Market" (old Western Precincts Market) along West Lexington Street between Eutaw, Paca and Greene Streets in 1782 and the "Broadway Market" (old Eastern Precincts Market) at the foot of Broadway - formerly known there too as Market Street (between Fleet [previously Canton Avenue] and Thames Streets) above the waterfront of the Fells Point neighborhood.  During the 19th century, additional market houses under sponsorship of the municipal government were constructed in all quarters of the growing city such as "Hanover Market", "Belair Market", "Richmond Market", "Lafayette Market" (now "The Avenue Market"), "Hollins Market", "Northeast Market", "Cross Street Market", "North Avenue Market" and others which dominated local trade, especially retail, but the most important, largest and center of the trade (including wholesale) was here at "Centre Market" on Market Place along the Jones Falls west bank.

Here also was the old second building of the famous Maryland Institute (then a college founded 1826,  of various curriculums including mechanical arts besides today's art and design for which it is now world-famous), which was built on brick arches above a second market house with two large clock towers at each end in 1851, and held an additional large assembly hall/auditorium and classrooms on the second floor. This was one of the largest and notable buildings in America at that time, and was the site of several pre-Civil War national political party conventions (when Baltimore preceded Chicago as the common compromise city for presidential nominations, where both candidates Millard Fillmore and Franklin Pierce were nominated to be President. Another famous President, Abraham Lincoln gave his "Liberty Speech" (also known as the "Baltimore Address") on April 18, 1864, at the "Sanitary Fair" event, one of several held throughout the Civil War-torn nation, to raise money for the support and assistance of wounded soldiers, widows and orphans and other domestic needs by the United States Sanitary Commission, (a precursor to the later American Red Cross). Although he passed through Baltimore numerous times, it was the only occasion that the 16th President spoke in the city. He noted the calmer differences in the southern-oriented city, especially then three years after the secessionist tumult resulting in the disastrous Pratt Street Riots  of April 19, 1861 which had solidified Baltimore's reputation and nickname as "Mobtown."  It was also the only time that he spoke alive in the city although having traveled through several times in his earlier brief congressional career and presidential administration.  The Maryland Institute and the second markethouse below was unfortunately destroyed and lost near the end of the Great Baltimore Fire of February 7–8, 1904, on the eastern edge of the blaze along with the rest of the downtown Baltimore business district in the Nation's third largest conflagration ever to hit an American city (Chicago's Great Fire of 1871 was first, followed by the 1906 San Francisco earthquake and fire).

During the general mass re-construction of the city's "Burnt District" in the next few years, three new three-story elaborate brick market buildings adjacent to each other on the east side of the square,  running east and west were built by 1907, under the supervision of the Centre Market Commission under chairman, General Felix Agnus, (the dominating owner/publisher of the city's largest and oldest newspaper, the "Baltimore American" dating from 1773, reorganized 1799). Newly constructed on the north side was the "Produce Market" for fruits and vegetables, in the middle was the "Fish Market" and to the south end was the "Retail/Wholesale Market" for various sundry dry items.  A new plaza was also constructed that year (1907), featuring a beautiful marble and stone fountain specifically designated by a noted animal-loving philanthropist, General A. E. Booth, for the laboring horses of the busy and crowded commercial district who toiled under heavy weights, reins, blinders, stirrups and heavily loaded cargo wagons, at the end of their ancient era and the beginning of motorized trucks and lorries and their smells of gasoline and diesel fuel odors.

By 1984, the traffic concerns and space problems caused the local wholesale fish merchants and those in the other markets to consider moving their delivery and transport centers to a new auto and truck oriented complex built between Baltimore and Washington in Jessup, Maryland along the connecting Interstate (95 and 295) and U.S. Route 1 highways. Despite the best efforts of then Mayor William Donald Schaefer and others of his administration and tourism leaders, who had a wonderful vision of an eastern version of San Francisco's famous "Fisherman's Wharf" and the nearby Monterey, California's "Fish Cannery" complex, plus Washington, D.C.'s  "Fish Market" which was centered on moored barges along the side channel of the Potomac River at Maine Avenue just south of the National Mall and a continuing center of popularity by the national capital's Washingtonians. Hoping to build something uniquely similar here with the old historic elaborate brick buildings, their Jones Falls-side water access and with the burgeoning "Inner Harbor", several blocks south. Mayor Schaefer even took a tour of an interesting development along the twisting stream, San Antonio River, that wound through the urban center of that iconic Texas city and saw the canal boats, canoes, paddle boats, with restaurants, music clubs and strolling tourists along the peaceful route that has since become world-famous attracting tourist visitors from the whole nation, so he attempted to create that vision he called "Fallswalk", for the route along the lower Jones Falls contained within its old late 19th-century stone retaining walls and its connecting grid of streets and alleys such as The Fallsway (built over the subterranean diversion tunnels for the Falls in 1912-1914) and the web of tangled narrow colonial-era alley streets of Front, President, Concord, Harrison, Frederick and Gay Streets running north to south between the east/west Fayette, Baltimore, Lombard and Pratt Streets. This concept was in the days before additional commercial and residential development had moved east and south across the Falls and began butting up against the tightly packed alley-streets with small brick and a few wooden rowhouses and restaurants of "Old Town" (renamed of colonial Jones Town),  "Little Italy" (in the renamed southern portion of old colonial "Jones Town") and the future "Harbor East" of high-rise hotels, office and apartment skyscrapers developed in the 1990s, followed by "Harbor Point" to the southeast on the small heavily polluted soil of the peninsula jutting into the Inner Harbor, formerly the site of a large ugly Allied-Signal chrome manufacturing/refining works since the Issac and Jesse Tyson and Brian Philpot beginnings in the 1840s.

Here leading further north above East Baltimore Street to the streets where the original Falls were covered over by the newly constructed "Fallsway"  and the sometimes flood-prone stream was diverted underground into three great concrete water tunnels during a flood-control public works project in 1912-13-14. Further north at Pennsylvania Station, used by various railway lines, the Falls emerges again at Mount Royal Avenue in a somewhat natural setting with small trees and shrubs surrounding its course with occasional concrete culverts continuing north out of the city, past the old stone / brick mills, raceways, culverts and dams of valley villages of Hampden and Woodberry, Mount Washington to the old Lake Roland public water reservoir of 1860 and its dam and further north to the Pennsylvania state line.

In the early 1980s in the Pratt Street Power Plant, Six Flags (corporation, owner/operator of amusement/theme parks from Texas) developed a Victorian-era indoor theme park, featuring an imaginary turn-of-the-century explorer/scientist/raconteur named "Phineas Flagg" (modeled after famous author Jules Verne's literary world traveler character in the science fiction/adventure novel "Around The World in Eighty Days", published 1873). Later in the decade, Six Flags expanded their downtown/Inner Harbor interests three blocks north to construct "The Brokerage" complex in the middle of the north end of Market Place bordering East Baltimore Street, on the eastern edge of downtown. This was adjacent to the Jones Falls west bank, and the new Shot Tower/Market Place station for the new "Metro" (subway). Across the Falls further east, was the new re-routing of the President Street Boulevard (running from the southern terminus of the Jones Falls Expressway ([Interstate 83] to the southeast waterfront in the new hotel/commercial and apartments/condos towers development of "Harbor East" and the future "Harbor Point."

But in the mid-1980s, the wholesale merchants could not be persuaded to stay and so moved out on the trucks to the Anne Arundel and Howard Counties' border line. Eventually the two northern and southern wholesale markets, despite their distinctive industrial but elaborate brick and trim stone architecture were razed, leaving the central structure - Fish Market a lone survivor. It was used briefly as a background scene during several segments about a license-revocation hearing before the newly established state Home Improvement Commission in locally raised, famous Hollywood producer, Barry Levinson's movie "Tin Men" (starring Richard Dreyfuss, Danny DeVito, and Barbara Hershey about Baltimore's nostalgic, but amusing aluminum-siding salesmen of the early 1960s) in 1987.

After Mayor Schaefer had moved on in that year to become Governor of Maryland, a new re-development proposal for the Centre Market Place was considered by expansion from the recent "Power Plant" amusement and retail complex on Pratt Street's old Pier 4 and the Inner Harbor. "The Brokerage" building was constructed on a north-south axis above the historic site of the old Maryland Institute/Centre Market for restaurants, bars, night clubs and a concert hall with some retail stores in the old remaining historic 1905–07 commercial buildings still remaining along the west side of Market Place and the north side of intersecting Water Street. Across the square with the still-flowing former horse fountain on the east side was constructed the Port Discovery children's museum in the old Wholesale Fish Market building, which was given a long-term lease by the City Council and government agencies (opened 1998). Although three blocks further north, the newly renamed "Power Plant Live!" now includes a new array of restaurants, bars, comedy clubs, dance clubs, dueling pianos, and other concepts as well as the popular concert hall venue Rams Head Live! (which was an expansion of the famously popular establishment "Rams Head Tavern" from downtown Annapolis). By 2013, the entertainment, commercial, and tourist aspects of the area still seem to be thriving and popular.  To the south of the "Port Discovery" museum was constructed a large "Harbor Park" structure with a parking garage on its upper floors and several convenience stores/eatery shops on the ground floor with a multi-screen movie theater, the first to be opened in downtown Baltimore since the former New Theatre in Charles Center's Charles Plaza (at North Charles and West Saratoga Streets) in the 1960s, which lasted until the late 2000s, when it was replaced by a newer "landmark" Cinema theatre further south on President Street Boulevard by the Katyrn Forest Massacre Memorial traffic circle/water fountain.

From 1978, on the west side of Market Place and continuing south across a bridge over East Lombard Street, stands the two-building "Harbor Campus" complex of the former Community College of Baltimore's (later renamed the Baltimore City Community College). The two red-glazed brick structures with unusual sloping walls facing Lombard Street were named for Dr. Harry Bard (first president of the new junior college) and Dr. William Lockwood. Dr. Bard, a legendary local educational leader, had a vision of a downtown campus to direct his vision of an "urban mission" for years to supplement the college's older, more traditional campus from the 1950s in northwest Baltimore on Liberty Heights Avenue. He was a firm supporter of former mayors Thomas L.J. D'Alesandro, Jr. and Theodore R. McKeldin with their visions of a future downtown Baltimore with the original "Charles Center" project in the late 1950s/early 1960s and the subsequent "Inner Harbor" revitalization beginning in the late 1960s. But by the 2000s, the financial pressures on the later state-operated academically troubled junior college and the economic pressure of increasing commercial/residential development in the Inner Harbor/Harbor East areas, led to the sale of the southern Lockwood Building to be razed after only two decades, and to be replaced by a newer development (renamed "Lockwood Place") between East Pratt and Lombard Streets, facing the waterfront and the "Power Plant" development with additional upper-level parking garages, offices, apartments/condos, and ground-floor restaurants and night clubs along East Pratt Street.  The remaining "Bard Building" is now shuttered and awaits some re-direction from the BCCC Board of Trustees and administration after three decades as to its downtown mission and opportunities of having a two-campus institution.

References

www.powerplant live.com

External links

Power Plant Live! website
, including photo from 1982, at Maryland Historical Trust

Buildings and structures in Baltimore
Culture of Baltimore
Inner Harbor, Baltimore
Tourist attractions in Baltimore
2001 establishments in Maryland
The Cordish Companies